Kılavuz can refer to:

 Kılavuz, Alaca
 Kılavuz, Bor
 Kılavuz(Turkish noun)